Alacranes del Norte (formerly known as Nejapa Fútbol Club) was a football club based in Chalatenango, El Salvador.

The club last played in the Segunda División. In January 2011, it was announced that the Alacranes del Norte license had been removed by the Segunda División, following financial difficulties for the owner, Mynor Vargas and the failure of attempts to find a new ownership group.

History

Nejapa Fútbol Club

Nejapa Fútbol Clube was formed on July 2002, thanks to collaboration with both the municipal council of Nejapa (without community collaboration) and the University of El Salvador (UES). When the equipment of the UES obtained a licence to play in the Second Division their representatives contacted René Canjura, mayor of Nejapa, to know if the town was interested in acquiring the space in the Third Division. In that month it concluded the process of inscription of the new equipment in the Third Division.

In 2004, Nejapa won promotion to the Second Division thanks to the help of both Colombian player Andrés Medina Aguirre and Manager Douglas Vidal Jiménez (former coach of ADET). In 2005/06 season Nejapa progressed all the way to the final but were then defeated by Nacional 1906.

In 2006, Carlos "El Cacho" Meléndez took the reins at Nejapa and started to sign both upcoming players and experienced ones, such as Mexican forward José Luis Osorio. In the  play-off semi final they defeated Municipal Limeño to reach the final, which they played against Juventud Independiente. They won with a winning goal by Osorio and earned promotion to the Primera División de Fútbol de El Salvador for the first time.

Relocation and rename to Alacranes del Norte
In 2010, some of C.D. Chalatenango's former players created a new team and merged it with Nejapa to establish a new club. They decided to move it to the city of Chalatenango and renamed the club to Alacranes del Norte (Scorpions of the North) due to their new city's geographical location. In January 2011 the club folded due to financial reasons.

Stadium

Under the Nejapa F.C. name, they played most of their home games at the Polideportivo Victoria Gasteiz in Nejapa, with occasions where the team would play in the Estadio Cuscatlán. Since late 2009, the Estadio José Gregorio Martínez in Chalatenango had served as their home stadium.

Sponsorship
Sponsors
 Front Milan (Kit manufacturer)
Caja de Crédito de Quezaltepeque
Tigo
MK medicamentos
 CANAL 12 de Televisión
Mides

Kit Information
Nejapa F.C. wore the red and white striped jersey since their establishment until 2008.
Then they upgraded their uniform to incorporate a yellow jersey, red shorts and yellow socks.
In 2010, after the club relocated from Nejapa to Chalatenango, the club decided to change the team colours from the current yellow and red to purple.

Honours
Segunda Division: 1
Clausura 2007

League season performance
(Apertura 2007 – Clausura 2010)

Top scorers in the first division
Apertura 2007  José Luis Osorio (6 goals)
Clausura 2008  Juan Carlos Reyes (9 goals)
Apertura 2008  Emiliano Pedrozo (5 goals)
Clausura 2009  Andrés Medina Aguirre (4 goals)
Apertura 2009  José Manuel Martínez (6 goals)
Clausura 2010  José Manuel Martínez   Guillermo José Morán  José Amílcar Ramírez  Juan Carlos Panameño   Cristian Ernesto López  (2 goals)

Managerial history

Presidential history
 René Canjura (2004–09)
 Gerardo Tomasino (2009)
  Mynor Vargas (2010)

References

External links
 Alacranes del Norte at Soccerway.com
 Football in Nejapa 1935–2002 – La Prensa Gráfica 
 Football in Nejapa 2004–2006 – La Prensa Gráfica 
 La Evolución de Nejapa – La Prensa Gráfica 

Defunct football clubs in El Salvador
Association football clubs disestablished in 2011
2002 establishments in El Salvador
2011 disestablishments in El Salvador
Association football clubs established in 2002